Yevhen Kotelnykov (21 March 1939 – 19 December 2017) was a Soviet soccer player and coach from Ukraine.

External links
 Yevhen Kotelnykov: "I am excited by our victory in Montenegro". Komanda. 11 June 2013.
 Novobranets, V. Yevhen Kotelnykov: "It is impossible to copy Lobanovsky". Komanda. 6 January 2014.
 Sai, Yu. Merited Coach of Ukraine Yevhen Kotelnykov: "heading towards the coaching seat, Lobanovsky never stepped on the lines that divide running lanes". Fakty. 21 March 2003.
 Match report of the game between Belarus and Ukraine, 27 July 1983.
 Brief bio at the Football Federation of Ukraine website.

1939 births
2017 deaths
Footballers from Kyiv
Vinnytsia State Pedagogical University alumni
Soviet footballers
FC Nyva Vinnytsia players
Soviet football managers
Ukraine national football team managers
Football Federation of Ukraine officials
Association footballers not categorized by position
Burials at Baikove Cemetery